Kungshamns IF is a Swedish football club located in Kungshamn.

Background
Kungshamns IF currently plays in Division 4 Bohuslän/Dalsland which is the sixth tier of Swedish football. They play their home matches at the Kungshamnsvallen in Kungshamn.

The club is affiliated to Bohusläns Fotbollförbund.  The second team, Sotenäs FC, play in Division 6. Kungshamns IF have competed in the Svenska Cupen on 19 occasions and have played 25 matches in the competition.

Season to season

Footnotes

External links 
 Kungshamns IF - Official website
 Kungshamns IF on Facebook

Football clubs in Västra Götaland County
Association football clubs established in 1919
1919 establishments in Sweden